Nickey is a given name, surname and a nickname, and may refer to:

Given name
Nickey Alexander, American drummer
Nickey Browning (born 1951), American politician
Nickey Iyambo (1936–2019), Namibian politician and physician

Nickname
 Nickey Barclay (born 1951),  American singer, songwriter and musician
 Nickey Brennan (born 1953), Irish former hurler
 Nickey Carroll (born 1972), Australian long-distance runner

Surname
Donnie Nickey (born 1980), American gridiron football player

See also
 Nickey (disambiguation)